Joseph McDermott may refer to:
 Joseph McDermott (actor) (1878–1923), American actor of the silent era
 Joseph H. McDermott (1871–1930), U.S. politician from the state of West Virginia
 Joe McDermott (politician) (born 1967), U.S. politician from the state of Washington
 Joe McDermott (golfer) (born 1940), Irish-American golfer
 Joe McDermott (baseball), American baseball pitcher